The Kopaonik Business Forum (KBF;  / Kopaonik biznis forum) is a Serbian and regional businesses conference held annually in March at the Kopaonik mountain resort in Serbia. It is organized by the Serbian Economists Association and patronised by the Prime Minister of the Republic of Serbia.

The conference gathers the Serbian corporate leaders, political leaders, economists, and journalists for four days to discuss the issues and development strategy of Serbia. It is often dubbed by media as the "Serbian Davos", relating to the World Economic Forum (WEF) meeting which is held annually in Davos, Switzerland.

Event archive

Kopaonik Business Forum 2015
22nd Kopaonik Business Forum was held from 3rd March to 5th March of 2015. It was attended by 500 participants including scholars, government representatives, diplomatic officials, business practitioners, and media. The focus was on new vision for industrialization of the economy and modernization of the society.

Kopaonik Business Forum 2016
23rd Kopaonik Business Forum was organised at Kopaonik Convention Centre from 8th March to 10th March of 2016. This years topic was "Catching up and convergence with leading trends: how to fix up the main fractures of the system".

Kopaonik Business Forum 2017
24th KBF event was held from 7 March to 9 March of 2022 on topics like "Intelligent Investments as New Government’s Agility after Fiscal Consolidation", "Sequenced Reform Agenda: Infrastructure Development, Public Sector Restructuring and Smart Growth" and "Sustainable and Inclusive Development: Industrial Policy Perspective". It was attended by more than 1000 participants.

Kopaonik Business Forum 2018
25th jubilee KBF was held from 4 March 2018 to 07 March 2018 on "Beyond Expansionary Austerity" topic. Other topics include Serbia’s economy growth. This years event was conducted in partnership with Mastercard. It was held at Grand Hotel & Spa located besides the National Park Kopaonik.

Notable speakers include: 
 Aleksandar Antić, Minister of Mining and Energy, Government of the Republic of Serbia
 Arvanitis Thanos, European Department Deputy Director, IMF
 Jasna Atanasijević, Director, National Secretariat for Public Policy, Government of the Republic of Serbia
 Ruben Atoyan, Senior Economist, European Department, IMF
 Prof. Jurij Bajec, Professor, Faculty of Economics, University of Belgrade
 Daniel Berg, Director for Serbia, EBRD
 Florian Bieber, Professor of Southeast European History and Politics and Director of the Centre for Southeast European Studies at the University of Graz, Austria

Kopaonik Business Forum 2019
The 26th KBF was held from 3rd March to 06 March of 2022. The topic for this event was "Serbia Ten Years after the Great Recession - Strong Growth as an Imperative". It took place at the Grand Hotel & Spa, Kopaonik with more than 1300 attendees.

Notable speakers include:
 Milan Antonijevic
 Jasna Atanasijević
 Branko Azeski
 Aleksandar Bijelic
 Milorad Bjelogrlić
 Slavko Carić

See also
Economy of Serbia Savez ekonomista Srbije

References

External links

Serbian Association of Economists

Recurring events established in 1994
1994 establishments in Serbia
Business in Serbia
Business conferences
Kopaonik
Serbian economists